Javier Omar Martínez Jaime (born 6 December 1971) is a retired Honduran football defender.

Club career
He started his career at Victoria with whom he had three different spells. He played abroad, for Guatemalan side Cobán Imperial and also played for Honduran giants Real C.D. España, C.D. Marathón and F.C. Motagua.

International career
Martínez made his debut for Honduras in a June 1996 friendly match against Venezuela, in which he immediately scored a goal in the dying seconds, and has earned a total of 18 caps, scoring 1 goal. He has represented his country in 1 FIFA World Cup qualification match and played at the 1997 UNCAF Nations Cup, as well as at the 2003 CONCACAF Gold Cup.

His final international was a February 2004 friendly match against Colombia.

International goals

References

External links

1971 births
Living people
People from San Pedro Sula
Association football defenders
Honduran footballers
Honduras international footballers
2003 CONCACAF Gold Cup players
C.D. Victoria players
Cobán Imperial players
Real C.D. España players
C.D. Marathón players
F.C. Motagua players
C.D.S. Vida players
Liga Nacional de Fútbol Profesional de Honduras players
Honduran expatriate footballers
Expatriate footballers in Guatemala